Margalita "Maka" Chakhnashvili-Ranzinger (born 9 December 1982) is a Georgian former tennis player.

Chakhnashvili-Ranzinger won ten singles and five doubles titles on the ITF Women's Circuit. On 30 July 2007, she reached her best singles ranking of world No. 134. On 15 June 2009, she peaked at No. 149 in the doubles rankings.

She achieved a 30–27 record for Georgia in Fed Cup competitions.

Chakhnashvili-Ranzinger was given a wildcard to represent Georgia at the 2012 Summer Olympics in the women's doubles draw. She teamed up with Anna Tatishvili, but lost in the first round.

ITF finals

Singles (10–12)

Doubles (5–10)

References

External links
 
 
 

1982 births
Living people
Sportspeople from Tbilisi
Female tennis players from Georgia (country)
Tennis players at the 2012 Summer Olympics
Olympic tennis players of Georgia (country)